Urbinati is an Italian surname. Notable people with the surname include:

Giovanni Urbinati (born 1946), Italian ceramicist and sculptor
Rob Urbinati (born 1952), American playwright, screenwriter, author, and director

Italian-language surnames
Toponymic surnames